The 2009 GMAC Bowl was the tenth anniversary edition of the GMAC Bowl, an American college football bowl game. The contest was played on January 6, 2009, as part of the 2008 NCAA Division I FBS football season at Ladd–Peebles Stadium in Mobile, Alabama, and featured the Tulsa Golden Hurricane playing the Ball State Cardinals.

The game, which was played in a second-half driving rainstorm, was won by Tulsa, 45–13. This was Tulsa's second consecutive GMAC Bowl victory, having defeated Bowling Green in the 2008 GMAC Bowl.

Scoring summary

References

External links
 ESPN summary

Gmac Bowl
LendingTree Bowl
Ball State Cardinals football bowl games
Tulsa Golden Hurricane football bowl games
2009 in sports in Alabama
GMAC Bowl